Alan Hope or Allan Hope may refer to:

Alan Hope (architect), RIAI Triennial Gold Medal recipient
Allan Hope (1903-1984), Australian rules footballer
Howling Laud Hope (real name Alan Hope; born 1942), British politician
Allan Hope (born 1952), better known as Mutabaruka, Jamaican Rastafari dub poet, musician, actor, educator, and talk-show host

See also
Alan Hopes (born 1944), British bishop